The Concepcion Islands are 17 variously inhabited and uninhabited islands in northeastern Iloilo, Philippines. The islands are politically subdivided into 11 island barangays and are part of the municipality of Concepcion. According to the 2010 census, the islands collectively have a population of 19,080, 48 percent the total population of Concepcion.

History
In 1604, Juan Salgado twice defeated Spanish pirates near Pan de Azucar. During World War II, Japanese forces shot down an American fighter pilot, which crash landed near Bag-o Abo Island.

Geography

The Concepcion Islands are located east of Panay Island in the Visayan Sea, and are part of the larger Western Visayas archipelago. The islands are part of the town of Concepcion, and comprise 40 percent of Concepcion's total land area. The nearest island is Tago, which is a coral reef  from the mainland, inside Concepcion Bay. Baliguian also marks the end of Concepcion's municipal waters. The majority of the islands are mountainous and wooded, ringed by white sand beaches and surrounded by reefs, shoals, and sandbars. A few of the islands feature lighthouses to aid ship navigation in this area.

Islands

The Concepcion Islands are:
 Agho Island
 Anauayan Island
 Bag-o Abo Island
 Bag-o Isi Island
 Baliguian Island
 Bocot Island
 Botlog Island
 Bulubadiangan Island
 Chico Island (Bag-o Sipol Island)
 Colebra Island (Bago-alas Island)
 Danao-Danao Island
 Igbon Island
 Malangabang Island
 Pan de Azucar Island
 Sombrero Island
 Tago Island
 Tagubanhan Island

See also 

 List of islands in the Philippines

References

External links 
 Concepcion Islands at OpenStreetMap
 Concepcion Islands at Explore Iloilo

Islands of Iloilo